is a former Japanese male volleyball player who played the position of setter. He was part of the Japan men's national volleyball team. On club level he played for Toyoda Gosei Trefuerza.

References

Further reading
 Profile at FIVB.org
 Japan 2009 Team Roster

1982 births
Living people
Japanese men's volleyball players
Place of birth missing (living people)
21st-century Japanese people